The statue of Sir Wilfrid Lawson (1829–1906) is an outdoor sculpture by David McGill, installed in Victoria Embankment Gardens in London, United Kingdom. The monument's allegorical sculptures depicting Charity, Fortitude, Peace, and Temperance were stolen in 1979.

References

External links
 

Allegorical sculptures in the United Kingdom
Grade II listed monuments and memorials
Lawson, Wilfrid
Monuments and memorials in London
Lawson
Lawson
Victoria Embankment